Max Pommer (born 9 February 1936) is a German musicologist and conductor, a director of the Leipziger Universitätschor and the founder and conductor of the Neues Bachisches Collegium Musicum.

Career 
Born in Leipzig, Pommer was a student of the Thomasschule in his home town, where he founded a chamber orchestra. He studied conducting and piano at the Musikhochschule Leipzig, and from 1960 to 1964 also musicology at the Leipzig University. He was the conductor of the Leipziger Universitätschor from 1973 to 1987. He founded in 1979 the Neues Bachisches Collegium Musicum, formed by players of the Gewandhausorchester, which gained him international recognition and awards. In 1980, he was appointed professor at the Leipzig University.

From 1987 to 1991, Pommer was Generalmusikdirektor of the MDR Sinfonieorchester.

Awards 
 1979: Kunstpreis der DDR
 1985: Nationalpreis der DDR für Kunst und Literatur, III. Klasse
 1985: Deutscher Schallplattenpreis
 2011: Biermann-Ratjen-Medaille of Hamburg

Literature 
 Horst Riedel: Stadtlexikon Leipzig von A bis Z. Pro Leipzig, Leipzig 2005, .
 Thomas Wolter: Hecht im Karpfenteich interview in alla breve – Magazin der Hochschule des Saarlandes für Musik und Theater, 8. Jahrgang (2003), H. 1, p 16 f

References

External links 
 
 Max Pommer (Conductor) Bach Cantatas Website

German male conductors (music)
Musicians from Leipzig
1936 births
Living people
University of Music and Theatre Leipzig alumni
Academic staff of Leipzig University
Leipzig University alumni
German musicologists
21st-century German conductors (music)
21st-century German male musicians